Erastus Johnson Turner (December 26, 1846 – February 10, 1933) was a U.S. Representative from Kansas.

Born in Lockport, Pennsylvania, Turner attended college in Henry, Illinois, in 1859 and 1860. He moved to Bloomfield, Iowa, in 1860. Enlisted in Company E, 13th Iowa Volunteer Infantry Regiment, in 1864 and served until the close of the Civil War. He attended Adrian (Michigan) College 1866-1868. He was admitted to the bar in 1871 and commenced practice at Bloomfield, Iowa. He moved to Hoxie, Kansas, in 1879 and resumed the practice of law. He served as member of the Kansas House of Representatives 1881-1885. Secretary of the Kansas Board of Railroad Commissioners from April 1, 1883, to August 1, 1886.

Turner was elected as a Republican to the Fiftieth and Fifty-first Congresses (March 4, 1887 – March 3, 1891). He was not a candidate for renomination in 1890. Practiced law several years in Washington, D.C. He moved to Seattle, Washington, in 1905 and continued the practice of law. He retired from active pursuits in 1916 and moved to Los Angeles, California, where he died on February 10, 1933. He was interred in Forest Lawn Mausoleum, Glendale, California.

References

1846 births
1933 deaths
People of Iowa in the American Civil War
Members of the Kansas House of Representatives
People from Hoxie, Kansas
Union Army soldiers
Republican Party members of the United States House of Representatives from Kansas
People from Bloomfield, Iowa
People from Erie County, Pennsylvania
Washington, D.C., Republicans
Washington (state) Republicans
California Republicans